The TAI TF-X (Turkish Fighter), alternatively named in Turkish as Milli Muharip Uçak (National Combat Aircraft), abbreviated as MMU, is a stealth twin-engine all-weather air superiority fighter in development by Turkish Aerospace Industries (TAI) and BAE Systems as its sub-contractor. The TF-X is planned to replace the F-16 Fighting Falcon aircraft of the Turkish Air Force and to be exported to foreign nations. It was officially announced that the TF-X's prototype will be rolled out on 18 March 2023, and make its first flight by the end of 2023. The taxiing and ground running tests of the prototype began two days before the scheduled roll-out, on March 16, 2023.

Development

On 15 December 2010, Turkey's Defense Industry Executive Committee (SSIK) decided to design, develop, and manufacture a national next generation air-superiority fighter which would replace Turkey's F-16 fleet and operate with other critical assets like the F-35 Lightning II.

In 2011, Turkey's Undersecretariat for Defense Industries (SSM), now known as the Presidency of Defense Industries (SSB), the procurement agency for the Turkish Armed Forces, signed an agreement with TAI for the conceptual development of basic capabilities. TAI and TUSAŞ Engine Industries (TEI) would lead the design, entry, and development processes of the fighter jet. The studies would reveal the cost of the fighter, while investigating which mechanical and electronic systems would be employed and included, and a wider perspective of the opportunities and challenges in military aviation. Funding equivalent to US$20 million was allocated for a 2-year conceptual design phase performed by the Turkish Aerospace Industries. TAI officials have stated that conceptual design phase should be complete in late 2013, with a report being prepared and submitted to the Prime Minister for the approval of development phase budget and framework. Jane's has described the project as "extremely ambitious".

Saab AB of Sweden 
In February 2013, meetings were held with Saab upon the instruction of then-Prime Minister Recep Tayyip Erdoğan, and an agreement was signed with TAI and the Swedish Saab company during the state visit of then-Turkish President Abdullah Gül to Sweden on 13 March 2013:

 Saab AB will provide technological design assistance for Turkey's TF-X program.
 TAI has the option to purchase Saab's fighter aircraft design unit.

Later this idea was abandoned and on January 8, 2015 then-Prime Minister Ahmet Davutoğlu announced that the TF-X program will be a completely independent domestic platform, not in partnership with Korea, Sweden, Brazil or Indonesia.

Design choice 

In 2015, the TAI released three potential airframe configurations:
 FX-1: Twin engine, Lockheed Martin F-22 like configuration 
 FX-5: Single engine, General Dynamics F-16 like configuration
 FX-6: High agility single engine canard-delta Saab JAS 39 Gripen like configuration
Turkish Prime Minister Ahmet Davutoğlu announced on 8 January 2015, that the TF-X will be a twin-engined fighter. The Undersecretariat for Defense Industries published its 2016 Performance Report in March 2017, where it was revealed that the final decision was to continue with the twin engine FX-1 configuration.

Bid
On 13 March 2015, the Turkish Undersecretariat for Defense Industries (SSM) officially issued a Request for Information to Turkish companies which had the capability "to perform a genuine design, development and production activities of the first Turkish fighter aircraft to meet Turkish Armed Forces' next generation fighter requirements" signalling the official start of the program. The contract for design and development of the fighter was signed between the SSM of Ministry of Turkish National Defense and Turkish Aerospace Industries Inc. on 5 August 2016. The SSM granted $1.18 bn. to Turkish Aerospace Industries to acquire necessary technologies and infrastructure for the design, testing and certification of the aircraft. In the same period, Request for Proposal was published for the engine of the aircraft, and General Electric, Eurojet and Snecma companies returned to this file. Within the scope of RFP, it was requested that engine infrastructure in Turkey would be developed and that it sho be domestic production as long as possible.

BAE Systems of United Kingdom
In December 2015, Turkey's Undersecretariat for Defense Industries (SSM) announced that it had chosen BAE Systems of the United Kingdom to assist with the design of the nation's next-generation air superiority fighter. The same day Rolls-Royce offered EJ200 engine technology transfer and joint-development of a derivative for the TF-X program. During the visit of the Prime Minister of the United Kingdom Theresa May to Turkey in January 2017, BAE Systems and TAI officials signed an agreement, worth about £100 million, for BAE Systems to provide engineering assistance in developing the aircraft. Following the agreement, the UK issued an open general export licence to defense companies willing to export goods, software or technology to Turkey.

Engine
On 20 January 2015, ASELSAN of Turkey announced that it had signed a memorandum of understanding with Eurojet, the manufacturer of the EJ200 engine used in the Eurofighter Typhoon. The announcement also stated that a derivative of the EJ200 will be used in the TF-X program. The two companies will additionally collaborate and co-develop engine control software systems and engine maintenance monitoring systems. Turkey's selection of the EJ200 evidenced TAI's intention to use supercruise capability. In May 2017, Rolls-Royce established a joint venture with the Kale Group of Turkey to develop and manufacture engines for the project. Another competitor is TRMotor Power Systems Inc. established in April 2017 by BMC, TAI and SSTEK. On 8 November 2018, TRMotor signed a memorandum of understanding with the Presidency of Defense Industries to develop a jet engine for the TF-X project.

While General Electric did not openly express interest in the TF-X project, its local partner Tusaş Engine Industries (TEI) announced that it will participate in the engine development phase. On 11 June 2018, TEI General Manager Mahmut Faruk Akşit said that they proposed a mature engine for which they had completed a commercial proposal for the infrastructure of sub-component tests for the compressor. He emphasized the advantage of GE engines over its competitors stating that they have significant OEM support whereas the collaboration between other companies were yet to thrive. TEI committed to submit all intellectual rights to the government. In October 2018, local media reported that an unknown number of initial production fighters will be equipped with General Electric F110 engines until Turkish Air Engine Company (TAEC) finalizes the local engine.

On 14 March 2022 Kale & Rolls-Royce re-started the progress of developing an engine for the TF-X program, stating that the previous disputes between the companies have been resolved and that the first prototype's of the TF-X will use the F110 engine.

On 5 March 2022, İsmail Demir, undersecretary for Defence Industries, in a television interview Demir said the government would now negotiate a possible engine deal with Rolls-Royce. “We had some issues [with Rolls-Royce] before,” he said. “These have been resolved. I think we are ready to work together.”

As of 31 May 2022, Rolls-Royce does not seem to engage in the development of an indigenous engine for TAI TF-X program yet as Turkey has sent Rolls-Royce a request for proposals and still waiting for the British engine maker’s assessment and reply. İsmail Demir, undersecretary for Defence Industries, said "It is imperative for us that the engine be produced in Turkey … that Turkey should possess intellectual property rights". His statement implies that the same dispute over intellectual properties of the engine which previously stalled the negotiation between Rolls-Royce and Turkey back in 2019  remained unresolved.

As of 2 June 2022, unknown number of General Electric F110 engines delivered to TEI as the first batch according to the agreement between Tusaş Engine Industries (TEI) and General Electric that comprises delivery of 10 engines in total.

On 2 July 2022, Defence Industry Agency published the invitation to tender for the domestic development of the engine to be used and İsmail Demir, undersecretary for Defence Industry Agency, stated that TRMotor, which is a subsidiary of TEI, has submitted its proposal and Turkish Air Engine Company (TAEC), consortium by Kale Group and Rolls-Royce, will submit its offer soon.

Rostec of Russia
Russian defense company Rostec at the Eurasia Air Show 2018 voiced an intention to join the TF-X program. In a surprise move, some Russian companies (United Engine Corporation) have also stated that they were ready to provide technology for the TF-X engine. Turkish defense officials confirmed that they are exploring this option and discussing potential cooperation models. Turkish President Recep Tayyip Erdoğan, accompanied by Russian President Vladimir Putin, were showcasing the fifth-generation Sukhoi Su-57 stealth fighter jet at the MAKS 2019 international airshow in the Moscow region on 27 August 2019.

Development schedule overview
Development Phase-1 was expected to officially commence by the end of 2014, however, initial conditions were met and the project has officially started in late 2018.

On June 30, 2021, the Turkish Air Force made an official presentation about the TF-X program to the press. In the presentation, it was stated that Phase-1 Stage-1 had started with preliminary design works, right after T0 stage. As part of preliminary design activities, a system requirements review (SRR) is currently being carried out. By the end of 2022, system functionality review (SFR) and system requirements review (SRR) will be completed. Thus, the preliminary design activities will come to an end. The program is expected to go to the next stage by 2023 when the initial roll-out occurs with engines capable of taxiing.

Phase-1 Stage-2 involves detailed design and qualifications carried out in the 2022-2029 period. The aircraft will roll out in 2023, critical design review (CDR) activities will be carried out in 2024, the production of the first aircraft, called Block-0, will be completed in 2025 and the first flight will be accomplished in 2026. Until that date, TAI aims to manufacture 3 prototypes. The Block-1 configuration is planned to be developed until 2029. The manufacture of 10 Block-1 fighter jets is planned within the scope of Phase-2, and the aircraft will be delivered to the Turkish Air Force between 2030 and 2033. In Phase-3, between 2034 and 2040, development and mass production activities of other TF-X blocks is planned.

Start of production 
On November 4, 2021, the first piece of MMU was manufactured. Temel Kotil, CEO of TAI said; "We have realized the production of the first part of our National Combat Aircraft. Every step we take for the survival project of our country is very meaningful and valuable for us. I would like to thank all my friends with whom we walked on the same path by working with enthusiasm and effort." The other 20,000 parts of TF-X are planned to be ready by the end of 2022.

TAI's Deputy General Manager responsible for TFX Dr. Uğur Zengin, stated on February 11, 2022, that 550 parts of TF-X were in production. The maiden flight was planned for 2025, but has been rescheduled for the end of 2023.

Pakistani "partnership" misunderstanding 
On 22 Feb 2022, Temel Kotil, President and CEO of TAI gave an interview revealing that Turkey was collaborating with the Pakistan military operated National University of Science and Technology (NUST) on the project, outsourcing component design to students and researchers. However, TAI later said that there was a misunderstanding and there is no Pakistani partnership currently in the project.

Design
The TF-X is the first 5th-generation aircraft involving digital twin technology for the design and production.

Requirements
In June 2021, the Turkish Air Force, in a presentation made to the press, announced its requirements for minimum capabilities of the TF-X:
 Improved aerodynamics and propulsion
 Super-cruise
 Sufficient and optimized combat radius
 Advanced and internal multi-spectral sensors (EW and RF/IR)
 Low observability
 Sensor fusion and autonomy
 Improved data-link capabilities for network-enabled warfare
 High precision stand-off weapons

Airframe
Hüseyin Yağcı, TAI's chief engineer on the TF-X program, has stated that all three conceptual designs thus far feature a design optimized for low radar cross-sectional density, internal weapons bays, and the ability to supercruise, features associated with fifth-generation fighter jets.

TAI's Advanced Carbon Composites fuselage facility, which was commissioned to produce fuselages for Lockheed Martin's Joint Strike Fighter (F-35) program, has been tasked with developing an Advanced Carbon Composite fuselage for the TF-X. The Turkish Undersecretariat for Defense Industries (SSM) has also issued a tender for the development of a new lighter carbon composite thermoplastic for the TF-X fuselage.

Radar and sensors
ASELSAN is currently developing an advanced active electronically scanned array radar which will use gallium nitride (GaN) technology for the TF-X program.

Avionics and equipment
The TF-X will be integrated from the cockpit to accompanying UAVs (most likely the TAI Anka) through encrypted datalink connections. The aircraft will likely use upgraded variants of Aselsan's own radar warning receiver (RWR), missile warning system (MWS), laser warning system (LWS), chaff and flare management, dispensing system and digital radio frequency memory (DRFM)-based jamming system, which are already deployed with the other air platforms.

Propulsion
Prototypes will be equipped with General Electric F110 engines until the TAEC engine, a joint venture between the Turkish KALE & British Rolls-Royce, is completed and ready. Ismail Demir also stated that besides these two engines, an alternative engine is found from an undisclosed nation.

Two-seat variant 
TAI announced that a double-seat variant will be developed for the TF-X. The aim is to use the MUM-T (Manned Unmanned Teaming) capability of the TF-X with maximum efficiency. With the additional seat, the pilot in the back will be able to coordinate and manage drones like the Bayraktar Kizilelma & Bayraktar TB2.

Preliminary specifications

See also

References

External links
 TAI TF-X official website

Proposed aircraft of Turkey
Proposed military aircraft
Turkish Aerospace Industries aircraft
Stealth aircraft
Twinjets